Hyleoza is a genus of beetles in the family Cerambycidae, containing the following species:

 Hyleoza confusa Tavakilian & Galileo, 1991
 Hyleoza lineata (Bates, 1869)

References

Prioninae